The slaty vireo (Vireo brevipennis) is a species of bird endemic to shrubby highlands of southern Mexico.

It differs from all other vireos in its predominantly slate gray plumage and long tail. These distinctions once afforded it its own genus, Neochloe. It also has green feather edgings on its wings and tail. Its eyes, belly, and chin are snow white, offsetting the otherwise dark gray plumage.

References

External links
 BirdLife Species Factsheet

slaty vireo
Birds of Mexico
Endemic birds of Mexico
slaty vireo
slaty vireo